The Liucura River is a river of Chile. It is fed by some rivers that originate in Huerquehue National Park, which include the outflow of Tinquilco Lake.

See also
List of rivers of Chile

References

Rivers of Chile
Rivers of Araucanía Region